Live One is a live album recorded at the Crown Casino in Melbourne by Australian guitarist Tommy Emmanuel. It was released in September 2005.

Reception
Amazon editor said "Australian guitarist Tommy Emmanuel will go down in history as one of the world's greatest guitarists - ever! Live One is a document of an extraordinary and unique talent - a rare instrumental album that transcends genre or age. It is pure entertainment, pure music." adding "Live One is 100 minutes exploring a wide and seeming endless repertoire - tender ballads, classic country picking, humorous anecdotes, old favorites, right through to blistering runs and mind boggling technique."

Track listing

References

Tommy Emmanuel albums
2005 live albums
Live albums by Australian artists